The list of railway stations in Cameroon includes:

Stations served by passenger trains

Towns served by rail

Existing 

( gauge plantation railway)
 Limbe - port, terminal, cement works

( gauge)

 Nkongsamba (W) – railhead in northwest - rehabilitate
 Mbanga (W) – junction in west
 Kumba (W) – branch terminus in west
 Bonabéri (W) – port in west

 Douala – river port - cement works - 62km
 Edéa – river crossing Sanaga River ; future junction to ocean port Kribi (114km)
 Mésondo
 Eséka
 Makak located in Center Province
 Otélé junction for Mbalmayo
 Yaoundé national capital – cement works

Rehabilitate 

 Nanga Eboko
 Bélabo – ballast quarry and concrete sleeper plant
 Ngaoundal
 Ngaoundéré – bauxite – railhead
 Ngoumen
 Otélé – junction for Mbalmayo
 Mbalmayo – river port branch railhead in east

Under construction 

 There are plans for an iron ore railway belonging to Sundance Resources, isolated from existing railways, going from  around Mbalam to a port at Kribi .  This line will be  gauge. This line would also extend a short distance into the Republic of Congo.  In September, 2011, a deal was struck with Legend Resources, also of Australia, to share railway and port infrastructure for another iron ore mine.  This line will be  gauge, but it might link with the  Camrail system.  Contracts for construction were signed in June 2014. Since the tonnage to be carried on this line is about 35MTpa, it needs powerful locomotives, which implies .
  Kribi – port (0 km)
 (junction) (cross border extension to other mines) at Nabeba in ROCongo.
  Mbalam – mine (510 km)

 Kribi
 130 km link for alumina traffic.
 Edéa – junction to Kribi.

 (junction) (0 km)
 (border)
  Nabeba, Congo – mine (70 km)
  Avima, Congo

Proposed or upgrade 
 In 2002, there were plans to extend a railway line from Kribi via Mbalmayo to Bangui in the Central African Republic.
 In September 2009, a Korean proposal surfaced to upgrade and duplicate the national railway system.
 In November 2013, Cameroon and China signed an agreement to build a high-speed standard gauge railway from Douala (port) to Yaoundé

 (eastwards)
 Mbalam
 Yokadouma for timber traffic

 (northwards)
 Ngaoundéré
 Maroua for timber traffic

  Ngaoundéré, Cameroon – northern railhead
  N'Djamena – capital of Chad

 These rail routes are 
 Edéa
 Kribi – deep water port
 Douala
 Limbe
 Douala
 Ngaoundere

Timeline

2020 
 Alumina mine at Minim, Martap and Birsok to Kribi port.

2015 
 Cameroon-Chad railway

2018 

 Cameroon started clearing the ground for a 130-km road and rail link from Edéa to the new port at Kribi.

2014 
 Birsok leases adjacent to Minim, Martap leases.

Maps 
 UN Map
 UNHCR Atlas Map

There are diesel depots at Douala-Bassa, Yaoundé, Bélabo and Ngaoundéré. The two-road

See also 
 Rail transport in Cameroon
 Railway stations in Chad
 Cement in Africa

References 

 
Railway stations
Railway stations